Gilberto González may refer to:

 Gilberto González (actor) (1906–1954), Mexican actor
 Gilberto González (triathlete) (born 1970), triathlete from Venezuela
 Gilberto Josué González (born 1990), Mexican boxer